Kong Chow Temple is a temple dedicated to Guan Di, located in the Chinatown neighborhood of San Francisco, California, in the United States.

History
The temple was founded, in 1849, by members of the Cantonese population of San Francisco. In 1854, the temple was renamed Kong Chow Clan Association, to stress the social activities planned by the temple. The Association provided social welfare and religious needs for the community. Like many buildings in the area, it was destroyed in the 1906 San Francisco earthquake, and the community worked together to rebuild it at its original location, 520 Pine, near St. Mary's Square.

The Los Angeles branch of the Kong Chow Family Association and Temple was designed by architect Gilbert Leong and opened in 1960.

Bess Truman's visit
Bess Truman visited the temple in 1948, where she prayed for positive results for her husband, Harry S. Truman's presidential run. While there, she also asked for a prediction about the results, due to the public's prediction that he would lose. While there, she held a container of Kau cim sticks, and shook them until one of the sticks fell to the ground. This stick was then exchanged for a piece of paper, which told a story, offering insight to her question. The prediction was favorable, and Truman would go on to win the presidential election. The prediction slip that was given to her is displayed in the temple.

Protests 
In 1968 and 1969, while in her nineties, Charlotte Ah Tye Chang led protests against plans to demolish the old Kong Chow Temple. Her niece, artist Nanying Stella Wong, joined her efforts. Chang did not live to see the old temple demolished, or the new Kong Chow Temple erected at another location in 1977.

Today

In 1977, the temple moved to its current building on Stockton Street in Chinatown, known as the Kong Chow Building. The association works closely with the elderly population, offers scholarships and other charitable projects for the neighborhood. They also organize prayer sessions, and participates in the Qing Ming Festival. Inside of the temple is a statue of Guan Di, which is worshipped in the main altar.

References

Taoist temples in the United States
Religious buildings and structures in San Francisco
Chinatown, San Francisco
Harry S. Truman
Divination
Religious organizations established in 1849
1849 establishments in California
Guandi temples
Buildings and structures destroyed in the 1906 San Francisco earthquake
Temples in California